CAES or C.A.E.S. may refer to:

Compressed-air energy storage
MIT Center of Advanced Engineering Study, a department of Massachusetts Institute of Technology
Smolensk Nuclear Power Plant aka Смоленская АЭС (САЭС) or Smolenskaja AEC (SAES), a nuclear power station in Russia since 1975